The Amatola rock gecko or Amatola flat gecko (Afroedura amatolica) is a species of African gecko endemic to South Africa.

References

amatolica
Endemic reptiles of South Africa
Taxa named by John Hewitt (herpetologist)
Reptiles described in 1925